Tell al-Fakhar ( "Pottery Mound") is a tell, or archaeological settlement mound, in Kirkuk Governorate, northeastern Iraq. Excavations were carried out at the site between 1967 and 1969 by the Directorate-General of Antiquities of Iraq. Excavations revealed two occupation phases that were dated to the Mitanni/Kassite and Neo-Assyrian periods, or mid-second and early-first millennia BCE. The mid-second millennium phase consisted of a large building, dubbed the "Green Palace", where an archive of circa 800 clay tablets was found.

History of research
The site was excavated by the Directorate-General of Antiquities of Iraq under the direction of Yasin Mahmoud al-Khalesi during one season in the winter of 1967–1968 lasting from 22 October to 27 January. The excavation was prompted by the fact that the site was threatened by the development of an irrigation project in the region and because illegal digging activities had been carried out there, after which children had found clay tablets on the surface of the mound. A second season was carried out in 1969.

The site and its environment
There are numerous other tells in the region that show evidence for occupation from prehistoric periods up to the Islamic era.

Occupation history
The excavation revealed two main occupation phases, termed Stratum I and II. In the oldest phase, Stratum II, a large structure with at least 17 rooms was uncovered. The walls had been plastered up to six times and the plaster was covered with green paint, hence the building was dubbed the "Green Palace". Based on architectural details such as the presence of drains and toilets, and the size of the different rooms, the building was divided in a private and public wing. In the public wing was a large room with benches along the walls that has been interpreted as a "reception hall" where the ruler could receive his guests. In front of the building was a large terrace paved with mudbricks.

At least 34 skeletons were found in the palace. The majority were located in 2 rooms and were associated with arrowheads and pieces of armour, suggesting that they died a violent death while defending the palace. This is also indicated by the fact that several doorways in the palace had been blocked, and that the palace was destroyed by a conflagration, as indicated by the burned walls and thick ash deposits on the floors. An archive of circa 800 clay tablets was found in the Green Palace, many of them also bearing seal impressions. Because the tablets were found in all of the rooms of the palace, it has been suggested that the archive was scattered during the pillaging of the building. Other finds included pottery, gold and silver adornments, bronze armour scales, copper leaf-shaped spear and arrowheads, glazed and glass bottles and cylinder seals.

After the end of Stratum II, the site was abandoned for some time. The next occupation phase, Stratum I, was badly preserved. Parts of three different structures were excavated, but the walls were only preserved up to a height of three or four rows of mudbricks. In one building with rooms grouped around a courtyard, several kilns were found but their purpose is unclear. In the second building, two ovens were found while one room in the third contained a basin built of baked mudbricks. Except for pottery, no other finds were recorded from this occupation phase.

Strata II and I are dated to the Mitanni/Kassite and Neo-Assyrian periods, or mid-second and early first millennia BCE, respectively. The proposed ancient name of Tell al-Fakhar is Kuruhanni.

See also

Cities of the ancient Near East

References

Further reading

Fakhar
Fakhar
Fakhar
Fakhar